This article provides details of international football games played by the DR Congo national football team from 2020 to present.

Results

2020

2021

2022

Forthcoming fixtures
The following matches are scheduled:

References

Football in the Democratic Republic of the Congo
Democratic Republic of the Congo national football team
2020s in the Democratic Republic of the Congo